Uwaldo Mohamed Pérez Morrison (born 25 October 1979) is a Guatemalan former football defender who last played for USAC of the Guatemalan premier division.

Club career
Born in the capital city Guatemala City, Pérez started his professional career at local Guatemalan giants Municipal and then had a spell at their eternal rivals CSD Comunicaciones. He then played for Marquense, Antigua and Suchitepéquez before joining Heredia in summer 2007. He moved to Sacachispas in April 2010.

In June 2010 he was revealed as one of several reinforcements of USAC.

International career
He made his debut for Guatemala in a January 2000 friendly match against Panama and has earned a total of 19 caps, scoring 1 goal. He has represented his country in 6 FIFA World Cup qualification matches and played at the 2001 UNCAF Nations Cup and the 2002 CONCACAF Gold Cup.

His most recent international was a January 2003 friendly match against El Salvador.

References

External links

1979 births
Living people
Sportspeople from Guatemala City
Guatemalan footballers
Guatemala international footballers
2001 UNCAF Nations Cup players
2002 CONCACAF Gold Cup players
C.S.D. Municipal players
Comunicaciones F.C. players
Deportivo Marquense players
C.D. Suchitepéquez players
Copa Centroamericana-winning players
Antigua GFC players
Association football defenders